"Hey Mr. D.J." is a song by American R&B group Zhané, recorded for their debut album, Pronounced Jah-Nay (1994). Co-written by group members Renée Neufville and Jean Norris, it was released as their debut single in August 1993 and also features a rap from Rottin Razkals member Fam. The song was produced by Naughty by Nature and samples "Looking Up to You" by Michael Wycoff. It received critical acclaim, peaking at number six on the US Billboard Hot 100 and was certified gold by the RIAA for selling 500,000 copies domestically. In Australia, it peaked at number nine, while reaching number 20 in New Zealand. In Europe, the song was a top 30 hit in Austria, Germany and the UK. Originally, it was recorded and released on the 1993 compilation album Roll Wit tha Flava. The accompanying music video, directed by Peter Allen, features the duo performing at a party.

Chart performance
 
"Hey Mr. D.J." was a moderate success on the charts on several continents, peaking at number two on both the RPM Dance/Urban chart in Canada and the Billboard Dance Club Songs chart in the United States. In Europe, it made it to the top 30 in Austria, Germany, and the United Kingdom, where it peaked at numbers 27, 29, and 26, respectively. On the German Singles Chart, the song spent a total of 13 weeks. In the UK, it reached its peak in its first week at the UK Singles Chart, on September 5, 1993. 

On the Eurochart Hot 100, "Hey Mr. D.J." peaked at number 62 in December 1993, but on the European Dance Radio Chart, it reached number 11. Outside Europe, it also hit number six on the Billboard Hot 100 in the US, number nine in Australia and number 20 in New Zealand. The single earned a gold record in the US, after a sale of 500,000 units.

Critical reception
Upon the release, J.D. Considine from The Baltimore Sun remarked that the DJ referred to in the song "isn't a radio man but a club jockey", stating that it "perfectly captures the loping bass and infectious groove that characterizes the best club hits." Larry Flick from Billboard felt the female act "earns points for not succumbing to the temptation of being just another bunch of new fill swingers. Instead, they choose to conjure memories of the Emotions by laying pretty vocal into the context of shimmying R&B bassline and subtle disco strings. The song itself is a bit thin, but engaging nonetheless—thanks mostly to a charismatic new act with the potential to lure more than a few DJs to the fold." James Bernard from Entertainment Weekly remarked that "Hey Mr. D.J." "caught fire with its prancing bass line and anthemic chorus." Rod Edwards from the Gavin Report found that their sound "falls between hip hop and R&B". Pan-European magazine Music & Media wrote that it's a "jazzy soul laden jam, flexing rhythm and blues muscle. Its warmth harks back to the '70s." 

Andy Beevers from Music Week gave it four out of five, complimenting it as an "excellent catchy soul track". He also remarked that it's "already selling like hotcakes on import". John Kilgo from The Network Forty felt that "sultry and smooth, Zhane' brings a fresh tasting low groove that's nicely reminiscent of a relaxing, flavorful '70s summer tune." He added that "their voices blend together like a shake from an ice cream parlor", and "proudly sing their tribute [to] record-spinners the world over. They do so without missing a beat on this exciting debut." A reviewer from People Magazine stated that "with a funky, old-school groove and light-as-air harmonizing", the song "jumps to the joys of getting down and having fun." Jonathan Bernstein from Spin commented, "I remember this," I said, awash in a rosy glow of nostalgia triggered by Zhané's undulating "Hey Mr. D.J." "1982, a year rich in classic soul singles." Then the rap kicked in, signifying that this was no chestnut, rather an irresistible instant standard."

Music video
A music video was produced to promote "Hey Mr. D.J.". It was directed by Peter Allen, and features Zhané performing the song at a club party with a D.J. playing the music for a dancing crowd. In between, the group is also seen performing the song in a park.

Impact and legacy
Retrospectively, AllMusic editor Jose F. Promis complimented the song as a "sleek slice of earthy, sophisticated soul that stands as one of the best R&B hits of the '90s." "Hey Mr. D.J." was voted number nine on website Slant Magazines list of the "100 Greatest Dance Songs" in 2006. Five years later, in 2011, it was voted number 86 in their list of "The 100 Best Singles of the 1990s". They wrote, "Straight-up, no-bullshit dance music. The duo pronounced "Jah-Nay" let the slack groove thang take you away to a place where the DJ will keep playing that song all night." Complex featured it in their list of "The Best 90s R&B Songs" in 2012. An editor, Brendan Frederick, called it "a simple ode to dancing the night away to your favorite song", and a "summertime party anthem". 

American entertainment company BuzzFeed ranked it number 45 in their list of "The 101 Greatest Dance Songs Of the '90s" in 2017. They added, "Great harmonies, chill vibe, rap bridge; all the things you needed to make a perfect early-‘90s R&B dance song." In an 2019 retrospective review, Daryl McIntosh from Albumism wrote that Kay Gee’s beat on the track "provided a sound reminiscent of late ‘70s disco band Chic, that, together with the perfectly complementary vocals, created a euphoria of modern funk." Slant Magazine ranked it number 22 in their list of "The 100 Best Dance Songs of All Time" in 2020. An editor said, "Still, no one nailed the formula quite like Zhané did with this velvet midnight blue floor-filler."

Accolades

(*) indicates the list is unordered.

Track listings

 12-inch vinyl "Hey Mr. D.J." (Maurice's club mix) – 6:37
 "Hey Mr. D.J." (Maurice's cub mix with rap) – 6:37
 "Hey Mr. D.J." (original mix) – 4:20
 "Hey Mr. D.J." (Mo's Hey D.J. Work This dub) – 6:25
 "Hey Mr. D.J." (UBQ's Underground dub) – 6:45
 "Hey Mr. D.J." (Moapella) – 2:38

 CD maxi-single'
 "Hey Mr. D.J." (original mix) – 4:20
 "Hey Mr. D.J." (7-inch remix) – 3:54
 "Hey Mr. D.J." (7-inch remix with rap) – 3:52
 "Hey Mr. D.J." (Maurice's club mix) – 6:39
 "Hey Mr. D.J." (Maurice's club mix with rap) – 6:39
 "Hey Mr. D.J." (Mo's Hey D.J. Work This dub) – 6:25

Charts

Weekly charts

Year-end charts

Certifications

Release history

References

1993 singles
Epic Records singles
Zhané songs
1993 songs
Song recordings produced by Naughty by Nature
Songs written by Treach
Songs written by KayGee
Songs written by Vin Rock